Novookhochye is a rural locality (a selo) in Ukrainsky Selsoviet of Seryshevsky District, Amur Oblast, Russia. The population was 115 as of 2018. There is 1 street.

Geography 
Novookhochye is located 26 km northeast of Seryshevo (the district's administrative centre) by road. Dobryanka and Ukrainka are the nearest rural localities.

References 

Rural localities in Seryshevsky District